Indivisible security or the indivisibility of security is a term first used during the cold war. First included in the Helsinki Accords as the "indivisibility of security in Europe", the term states that the security of one nation is inseparable from other countries in its region. In 2022, Russia has used this term to justify its military build-up near Ukraine, which ultimately led to a full-fledged invasion. The term has also been promoted by China, including as part of its promoted "global security initiative".

References 

Foreign relations of Russia
Foreign relations of China